Rich Owens (June 19, 1880 – February 26, 1948) was Oklahoma's executioner from 1918 to 1947 at the Oklahoma State Penitentiary. He was responsible for 65 executions, and killed 10 others in his lifetime. Owens was also the boss of a prison work crew. He died of liver cancer on February 26, 1948, after falling ill in September 1947.

References

American executioners
1880 births
1948 deaths
Place of birth missing